Russia qualified for the Rugby World Cup for the first time in 2011.

As of April 26, 2010, Russia placed at 19th position in the world rankings, just behind Romania and the USA. They are currently the ninth best team in Europe according to the world rankings.

By position

By match

2011 Rugby World Cup

Pool C

2019 Rugby World Cup

Pool A

Japan vs Russia

Notes:
 This was the first Rugby World Cup opener not to feature a Tier 1 nation.
 Kotaro Matsushima (Japan) became the first Japanese player to score a hat-trick at a World Cup, and the first player to score one in a Rugby World Cup opener.
 Russia's try was the fastest to be scored in an opening match of a Rugby World Cup.

Russia vs Samoa

Notes:
This was the first meeting between the two nations.
Ahsee Tuala was due to start the game, but was replaced with Henry Taefu following injury ahead of kick off.

Ireland vs Russia

Notes:
Igor Galinovskiy (Russia) earned his 50th test cap.

Scotland vs Russia

Notes:
This is the first meeting between the two nations.
Vladimir Ostroushko (Russia) earned his 50th test cap.
Scotland became the first team to record multiple nilled-victories over their opponent in one World Cup campaign, and become the first team to record a fifth nilled-victory in World Cup history.
Mathieu Raynal was due to referee this game but withdrew ahead of kick off due to illness - Wayne Barnes stepped up from assistant with Alexandre Ruiz covering the assistant role.

World Cup Records

Team Records

Most points in a tournament
57 In (2011)
19 in (2019)

Highest Score

22 vs  2011
17 vs  2011
12 vs  2011
10 vs  2019
9 Vs  2019

Highest Winning Margin
Nil

Highest Score Against

68 vs  2011
62 vs  2011
61 vs  2019
53 vs  2011
35 vs  2019

Biggest Losing Margin

61 vs  2019
50 vs  2011
46 vs  2011
35 vs  2019
25 vs  2019

Most Tries in a Game

3 vs  2011
3 vs  2011
2 vs  2011
1 vs  2019

Most Penalty Goals in a Game

2 vs  2011
2 vs  2019
1 vs  2019

Most Drop Goals in a Game

1 vs  2011
1 vs  2019

Individual Records

Most Appearances
8 Vladimir Ostroushko(2011,2019)
8 Andrey Garbuzov (2011,2019)
8 Vasily Artemyev (2011,2019)
6 Yuri Kushnarev (2011,2019)

Top Point Scorers
19 Konstantin Rachkov
17 Yuri Kushnarev
10 Vladimir Ostroushko
10 Denis Simplikevich
5 Vasily Artemyev
5 Alexey Makovetskiy
5 Alexander Yanyushkin
5 Kirill Golosnitsky

Most Points In A Game
12 vs  - Konstantin Rachkov (2011) 
9 vs  - Yuri Kushnarev (2019)

Top Try Scorer
2 Vladimir Ostroushko
2 Denis Simplikevich
1 Vasily Artemyev
1 Alexey Makovetskiy
1 Alexander Yanyushkin
1 Konstantin Rachkov
1 Kirill Golosnitsky

Most Penalty Goals
4 Yuri Kushnarev
1 Konstantin Rachkov

Top Drop Goals
1 Konstantin Rachkov
1 Yuri Kushnarev

Hosting
Russia has not hosted any World Cup games.

References
 Official RWC 2011 Site

Russia national rugby union team
Rugby World Cup by nation